Anna Jeanette Waronker (born July 10, 1972) is a singer/songwriter, composer, and producer best known as the frontwoman of That Dog. She is the daughter of producer Lenny Waronker and actress and musician Donna Loren, the sister of session drummer Joey Waronker, and is married to Steven Shane McDonald of Melvins and Redd Kross.

That Dog (1991–1997, 2011–present)

Waronker was born in Los Angeles, California. After graduating from high school, Waronker formed the band that would become That Dog. The group consisted of Waronker on lead vocals and guitar, Petra Haden on violin, Rachel Haden on bass, and Tony Maxwell on drums. That Dog released three albums on DGC Records: That Dog, Totally Crushed Out!, and Retreat from the Sun. They toured with such acts as Beck, Weezer, and Blur. That Dog announced their breakup in 1997 after their third album, Retreat from the Sun, which had originally been intended as Waronker's first solo record. That Dog reunited in 2011.

Solo work
Anna founded her own record company, "Five Foot Two Records," with her sister-in-law Charlotte Caffey, on which she released her first solo record in 2002, titled Anna By Anna Waronker.

Waronker recorded a cover version of the song "Catch" by The Cure specifically for the Songs For Summer compilation album, a memorial for Summer Brannin.

In the early 2000s, Waronker played several solo shows and a few other shows with the short-lived Ze Malibu Kids. Waronker is also heard in the song "No Soul" by the band Say Anything. Anna provides vocals on the tracks Be Calm and At Least I'm not as Sad as I Used to be by New York band Fun.

Anna has contributed to various film and TV soundtracks, including the score and an original song for Dealbreaker (a short film co-written and directed by Mary Wigmore and Gwyneth Paltrow).

Other projects
During the time she was with That Dog, Waronker and bandmate Petra Haden backed up Beck on a number of demos and b-sides. Waronker has also co-produced with her husband Steven McDonald on several projects, including his revision of the White Stripes album White Blood Cells, and the Imperial Teen albums On and The Hair the TV the Baby and the Band.

Waronker is a member of Ze Malibu Kids, which also includes Steven McDonald, Jeff McDonald, and Astrid McDonald.

Waronker has composed and scored for film and television, including Josie and the Pussycats and the television series Clueless (1996–1999), where she collaborated with Charlotte Caffey (the Go-Go's). Five of Waronker's songs were featured on the television series Dawson's Creek.

Waronker played Joan Jett in the film What We Do Is Secret written and directed by Rodger Grossman. In 2005, she contributed to the UNICEF benefit song, "Do They Know It's Hallowe'en?". In 2007, Waronker appeared on Say Anything's "In Defense of the Genre", where she performed guest vocals on the track "No Soul". In late April 2007, Waronker's song "How Am I Doing?" was played at the end of a Grey's Anatomy episode, entitled "Desire". A sample of her song "I Don't Wanna" was played in the 2008 Movie The Haunting of Molly Hartley.

In October 2008, she collaborated with her sister-in-law Charlotte Caffey on Lovelace: A Rock Musical.

On February 8, 2011 Waronker's California Fade was released via digital download and limited vinyl orders.

Waronker provides backing vocals on "The Getaway", the title track to the Red Hot Chili Peppers eleventh studio album which was released on June 17, 2016 and on A Walk with Love & Death by the Melvins (now joined by Steven McDonald), released on July 7, 2017. She also co-wrote the Melvins song "Embrace the Rub", from their 2018 album Pinkus Abortion Technician, with McDonald and Josh Klinghoffer.

In 2021, Waronker and Craig Wedren collaborated on the soundtrack to Showtime's Yellowjackets. Together they composed and produced the original theme song "No Return" for the opening credits, as well as the score for the show. This followed on from their collaboration on Hulu's Shrill in 2019.

Partial discography
That Dog
That Dog (1994)
Totally Crushed Out! (1995)
Retreat from the Sun (1997)
Old LP (2019)

Ze Malibu Kids
Sound It Out (2002)

Solo Work
Anna (2002)
Castle (Music from the TV Show) – EP (2009)
California Fade (2011)

References

External links
Anna Waronker Official Site
Lovelace: A Rock Musical
Anna's MySpace Page
Dawsons Creek Song Listing
that dog Tablature
Anna Waronker Tablature at Ultimate-Guitar

1972 births
American women composers
21st-century American composers
American women singer-songwriters
American rock guitarists
American rock singers
American rock songwriters
American people of German-Jewish descent
Living people
That Dog members
Singer-songwriters from California
Guitarists from Los Angeles
20th-century American women singers
21st-century American women singers
21st-century American women guitarists
21st-century American guitarists
20th-century American women guitarists
20th-century American guitarists
21st-century women composers
20th-century American singers
21st-century American singers